Ashwin Chimanlal Choksi (1944-2018) was an Indian billionaire businessman, and the non-executive chairman of Asian Paints Ltd, India's largest paint company. He was among the top 100 richest Indians.

Early life
Ashwin Choksi was born in 1944 in Mumbai. His father Chimanlal Choksi was one of the co-founders of Asian Paints. Choksi completed his Masters in Commerce from Sydenham College, Mumbai.

Career
Choksi joined the family business Asian Paints in 1965. He became managing director and executive chairman, and a non-executive director of Berger International.

On 19 September 2018, Choksi died after a brief illness.

Family
Choksi was married with two children, Ashish Choksi and Rupen Choksi, and they lived in Mumbai.

References

1944 births
2018 deaths
Businesspeople from Mumbai
Indian industrialists
Indian billionaires